Andrey Grigorievich Kashechkin (born 21 March 1980) is a Kazakhstani road racing cyclist, who last rode for the UCI ProTour team .

Biography
Kashechkin was born in Kyzyl-Orda, in the former Kazakh Soviet Socialist Republic.

After the junior World Championships at Valkenburg, Kashechkin moved to Belgium, where he turned pro in 2001 with the Domo-Farm Frites team.

After two seasons in that team, Kashechkin joined , where he posted good results throughout the 2006 season.

Kashechkin was in 8th place in the overall classification after 15 stages of the 2007 Tour de France. However, his Tour was ended when his  team withdrew from the event after team leader Alexander Vinokourov tested positive for blood doping.

Doping
In August 2007, Kashechkin tested positive for blood doping after 2007 Tour de France.  He was fired from Astana on 31 August after his B-sample also tested positive.

Kashechkin intended to return to pro cycling in the middle of 2009, but was unable to find a team. In the middle of the 2011 season, however, Lampre released him and he re-signed with Astana in order to ride the Vuelta a España. He had some trouble again at Astana in 2012 and was sidelined after refusing to sign an ethical agreement, although eventually the team reinstated him once he complied.

Career achievements

Major results

1999 
 National Road Championships
 5th Road race
 5th Time trial
2000
 4th Overall Flèche du Sud
2001
 1st  Overall Le Triptyque des Monts et Châteaux
 1st La Côte Picarde
 2nd Flèche Ardennaise
 3rd Liège–Bastogne–Liège U23
 5th Circuit de Wallonie
2002 
 7th Overall Tour de la Région Wallonne
2003
 5th Giro del Lazio
 9th Memorial Rik Van Steenbergen
2004
 1st Overall Sachsen Tour
 1st Grand Prix de Fourmies
 3rd Regio Tour International
 1st  Young rider classification 
 7th Route Adélie
2005
 3rd Road race, National Road Championships
 6th Time trial, UCI Road World Championships
2006
 1st  Road race, National Road Championships
 1st Stage 6 Paris-Nice
 3rd Overall Vuelta a España
 1st Stage 18
 3rd Overall Deutschland Tour
 3rd Clásica de San Sebastián
 5th Overall Tour de Romandie
2007
 3rd Overall Tour de Romandie
 3rd Overall Critérium du Dauphiné Libéré
2009
 2nd Overall Drei Etappen Rundfahrt Frankfurt
 1st Stage 2
2010
 3rd Overall Vuelta a la Independencia Nacional
2012
 1st Stage 4 Vuelta a la Independencia Nacional
 1st Stage 1 Giro della Valle d'Aosta
 1st Stage 2 Tour of Bulgaria

Grand Tour general classification results timeline

See also
List of doping cases in cycling
List of sportspeople sanctioned for doping offenses

References

External links

Kashechkin tests positive for blood doping

1980 births
Living people
People from Kyzylorda
Kazakhstani male cyclists
Kazakhstani sportspeople in doping cases
Kazakhstani Vuelta a España stage winners
Doping cases in cycling
Olympic cyclists of Kazakhstan
Cyclists at the 2004 Summer Olympics
Asian Games medalists in cycling
Cyclists at the 1998 Asian Games
Cyclists at the 2002 Asian Games
Cyclists at the 2010 Asian Games
Medalists at the 2002 Asian Games
Asian Games bronze medalists for Kazakhstan